Bernt Albert (born 11 October 1944) is a Norwegian politician for the Conservative Party.

He served as a deputy representative to the Parliament of Norway from Vest-Agder during the term 1969–1973. In total he met during 2 days of parliamentary session.

See also
List of political parties in Norway

References

1944 births
Living people
Conservative Party (Norway) politicians
Deputy members of the Storting
Vest-Agder politicians
Place of birth missing (living people)
20th-century Norwegian politicians